Dempo Mining Corporation Limited  is a prominent mining company from the western Indian state of Goa. The mineral business was founded by Mr. Vasantrao S. Dempo in 1941 along with his younger brother Mr. Vaikuntrao Dempo. Mr. Vasantrao S. Dempo was the Founder Chairman of the company, who was succeeded by his son Mr. Vasudeva V. Dempo. Currently Shrinivas V. Dempo, son of Mr. Vasudeva V. Dempo is the chairman of Dempo Group. Dempo Sports Club is linked to Dempo mining company.

Holding of Dempo House
Dempo recently has divested its mining assets and has entered many businesses
The following are the companies which are fully or partially owned by the House of Dempo:

Hindustan Foods
This Dempo Group company, established in 1988 as a joint venture with Glaxo, manufactures cereal-based food products including baby foods. Hindustan Foods manufactures high quality cereal- based food products for all age groups. The range encompasses baby foods, instant porridge, breakfast cereals and health drinks. The Vanity Case Group, led by Mr. Sameer Kothari, acquired a majority stake in 2013. The company is responsible for manufacturing about a third of Hindustan Unilever’s beverage business, like Bru coffee and Lipton tea. It also works with companies like Danone and US Polo.

Dempo Travels
 Sensing the tourism potential of Goa, the Dempo Travel Agency was established in 1960 as a travel division of the flagship V.S.Dempo & Company Pvt. Ltd, and has been one of the mainstays of Goan tourism industry. In 2000-01, a new company, Dempo Travels Pvt Ltd., was formed to handle this business independently.

Dempo Industries Newspaper Publishing
The two main divisions under this company are the newspaper publishing division under the aegis of Navhind Papers and Publications and the Energy division. Apart from writers of national repute, it features the most respected writers of Goa. To cater to the needs of the Marathi speaking population "Navprabha" was launched in 1970. It is a respected Marathi newspaper in Goa, with editorials, supplements and special issues.

Dempo Ship Building
There exist two group companies in this business, Dempo Shipbuilding and Engineering Pvt. Ltd. and Dempo Shipyard Pvt. Ltd. Another facility, on the banks of river Zuari, in the name of Dempo Shipyard Pvt Ltd has been added in recent years, to take advantage of the growing business in this industry. This company has already built a number of barges and has several orders in hand. The higher draft of the Zuari River allows bigger barges to be constructed in this facility.

Goa Carbon

Manufacturer and marketer of Calcined Petroleum Coke, this Dempo Group company is listed on the Bombay Stock Exchange. Goa Carbon is the second largest manufacturer of Calcined Petroleum Coke in the country. Calcined Petroleum coke is a pure form of carbon and is used for making anodes for Aluminium smelting. It is also used as a source of carbon in the steel industry. Other specialty consumer segments include titanium dioxide and other chemicals. Goa Carbon was established in 1976. It has manufacturing facilities in Goa, Paradeep and Bilaspur. Total capacity is 240,000 MT per annum.

Aparant Iron and Steel
This Dempo group company manufactures pig iron. Plans to add further value to the product are on the anvil. Based on Tata Korf technology, this mini blast furnace based plant has a capacity of 160,000 TPA.

Devashri Nirman LLP 
Devashri Real Estate Developers was launched by the Dempo family twenty five years ago, the developers have projects in Panaji, Taleigao, Porvorim, Vasco, Caranzalem and Candolim.

External links
 Dempos
 Dempo Travels
 Navhind Times

References

Mining companies of India
Companies based in Goa
Vedanta Resources
1941 establishments in Portuguese India